Émilienne Demougeot (1910, Bourges – 19 June 1994, Montpellier) was a French historian, a specialist of Late Antiquity and Early Christianity. She was one of the first women professors of history at a French university, and the first woman professor at the Faculty of Letters at the University of Montpellier.

Life 
She attended elementary and high school in Guadeloupe from 1917 to 1922, then in Tangier in 1925–1926. Once a history teacher, she taught in high school before the war, and then as an assistant at the Sorbonne. She defended her thesis, De l’Unité à la division de l’Empire romain. Essai sur le gouvernement impérial (395-410), in 1949.

She was professor of ancient history at the Faculty of Letters of Montpellier from 1957 to her retirement in 1978. She won the Prix Thérouanne in 1952 for her work, De l’unité à la division de l'Empire Romain. With the prize she was awarded 2,000 francs. She left a great work especially the monumental Formation de l’Europe et les invasions barbares. She bequeathed her library to the library of ancient history of the Paul-Valéry University in Montpellier.

References

Bibliography 
1988: 
1982: Le Colosse de Barletta, Mélanges de l'École française de Rome. Antiquité, T. 94, n°2, 1982,  read on Persée
1980: in collaboration with Michel Christol, André Chastagnol, Mélanges de numismatique, d'archéologie et d'histoire : Offerts à Jean Lafaurie, Société française de numismatique, 286 pages
1969: , online, online.
1969: 
1969: 
1968: Remarques sur les débuts du culte impérial en Narbonnaise (Offprint from Provence historique, v. 18, fasc. 71) [The Sackler Library, University of Oxford, has a signed copy of this text)
1954: 'A propos des interventions du pape Innocent Ier dans la politique séculière' (Presses Universitaires de France) Revue historique [offprint] pp. 23–38
1953: Notes sur l'évacuation des troupes romaines en Alsace au début du Ve siècle (Delle: [Institut des hautes études alsaciennes])
1951: De l'unité à la division de l'Empire romain, Paris, Adrien-Maisonneuve, 618 pages

External links 
 Émilienne Demougeot on CERCAM

20th-century French historians
French women historians
French scholars of Roman history
1910 births
Writers from Bourges
1994 deaths
French classical scholars
Women classical scholars
Academic staff of the University of Montpellier
20th-century French women writers
Classical scholars